Sorry If I Want to Marry You is a 2010 Italian comedy film directed by Federico Moccia.

It is the sequel to the film Sorry but I call you love and is portrayed by Raoul Bova and Michela Quattrociocche with the original music by Emanuele Bossi and the Zero Assoluto.

Cast 
 Raoul Bova - Alessandro 'Alex' Belli
 Michela Quattrociocche - Niki
 Andrea Montovoli - Guido
 Francesco Apolloni - Pietro
 Luca Angeletti - Enrico
 Cecilia Dazzi - Simona
 Ignazio Oliva - Flavio
 Francesco Arca - photographer
  - Erica
  - Susanna
  - Diletta

References

External links 

2010 comedy films
2010 films
Italian comedy films
Films about weddings
Italian sequel films
2010s Italian films
2010s Italian-language films